Valaam (also known by the Finnish name Valamo) is an archipelago in the northern portion of Lake Ladoga, lying within the Republic of Karelia, Russian Federation. The total area of its more than 50 islands is 36 km². The largest island is also called Valaam. Other named islands are: Skitsky (second by size), Lembos, Sviatoy, Bayonny, Moskovsky, Predtechensky, Nikonovsky, Divny, Emelyanov, Oboronny, Goly, Savvaty's, Zosima's, Skalisty, Lukovy, Ovsiany, Rzhanoi, Nikolsky.

It is best known as the site of the 14th century Valaam Monastery  on Valaam Island and for its natural environment. In the 12th century, the islands were a part of the Novgorod Republic. In the 17th century, they were captured by Sweden during the Time of Troubles, but Russia reconquered them less than a century later. When the Grand Duchy of Finland was set up in the early 19th century as an autonomous part of the Russian Empire, Alexander I of Russia made Valaam a part of Finland. In 1917, Valaam became a part of newly independent Finland, but it was annexed by the USSR after the Winter War and Continuation War.

 The climate and natural history of the island are unique because of its position in Lake Ladoga. Spring begins at the end of March and a typical summer on Valaam consists of 30–35 sunny days, which is more than on the mainland. The winter and snow arrive in early December. In the middle of February the ice road to the nearest city of Sortavala is traversable. The average temperature of February is minus .

More than 480 species of plants grow on the island, many of which have been cultivated by monks. The island is covered by coniferous woods, about 65% of which are pine.  Ten species of mammals and more than 120 avian species call the archipelago home.

The island was visited repeatedly by emperors Alexander I, Alexander II, and other members of the imperial family. Other famous visitors include Tchaikovsky and Mendeleyev.

The island is permanently inhabited by monks and families. In 1999, there were about 600 residents on the main island; including army service personnel, restoration workers, guides and monks. There is a kindergarten, an arts and sports venue, a school, a small museum and a medical centre. The community on Valaam at the moment has no official administrative status.

During the summer, the main island can be reached by tour boats which leave St. Petersburg at night and arrive at the island the following morning.

The president of the Russian Federation has a dacha on one of the islands of Valaam, but its precise location is not publicly known.

References

Sources
 Selby, N. St. Petersburg, 2nd. edition, 1999, Lonely Planet Publications

External links

http://nordictravel.ru/page/valaam.html
https://web.archive.org/web/20130404201414/http://valaam.ru/en/
http://www.brill.com/oldest-one-russia

Landforms of the Republic of Karelia
Archipelagoes of Europe
Lake islands of Europe
Lake islands of Russia
World Heritage Tentative List
Sortavala
Museums in the Republic of Karelia